Dagbertus is a genus of plant bugs in the family Miridae. There are more than 40 described species in Dagbertus.

Species
These 42 species belong to the genus Dagbertus:

 Dagbertus amapaensis Carvalho, 1988
 Dagbertus antillianus Carvalho & Fontes, 1983
 Dagbertus bahianus Carvalho, 1975
 Dagbertus bermudensis Carvalho & Fontes, 1983
 Dagbertus bonariensis (Stal, 1859)
 Dagbertus carabobensis Carvalho, 1987
 Dagbertus caraboensis Barros de Carvalho
 Dagbertus carmelitanus Carvalho & Fontes, 1983
 Dagbertus curacaoensis Carvalho & Fontes, 1983
 Dagbertus darwini (Butler, 1877)
 Dagbertus diamantinus Carvalho, 1984
 Dagbertus emboabanus Carvalho, 1985
 Dagbertus eustatiuensis Carvalho & Fontes, 1983
 Dagbertus fasciatus (Reuter, 1876)
 Dagbertus figuratus Gagne, 1968
 Dagbertus formosus Carvalho, 1968
 Dagbertus froeschneri Carvalho, 1985
 Dagbertus guaraniensis Carvalho & Fontes, 1983
 Dagbertus hospitus (Distant, 1893)
 Dagbertus insignis Carvalho, 1977
 Dagbertus irroratus (Blatchley, 1926)
 Dagbertus lineatus Gagne, 1968
 Dagbertus marmoratus Carvalho, 1968
 Dagbertus matogrossensis Carvalho & Fontes, 1983
 Dagbertus mexicanus Carvalho & Schaffner, 1973
 Dagbertus minensis Carvalho & Fontes, 1983
 Dagbertus nigrifrons Gagne, 1968
 Dagbertus oaxacensis Carvalho & Fontes, 1983
 Dagbertus obscurus Carvalho & Fontes, 1983
 Dagbertus olivaceus (Reuter, 1907)
 Dagbertus pallidus Gagne, 1968
 Dagbertus paraensis Carvalho, 1980
 Dagbertus pellitus (Distant, 1893)
 Dagbertus peruanus Carvalho, 1985
 Dagbertus phaleratus (Berg, 1892)
 Dagbertus potosianus Carvalho & Fontes, 1983
 Dagbertus quadrinotatus (Walker, 1873)
 Dagbertus salvadorensis Carvalho, 1985
 Dagbertus semipictus (Blatchley, 1926)
 Dagbertus sinopensis Carvalho & Fontes, 1983
 Dagbertus spoliatus (Walker, 1873)
 Dagbertus suspectus (Reuter, 1907)

References

Further reading

 
 
 

Articles created by Qbugbot
Mirini